Dugarwadi waterfall is  from Nashik on Trimbakeshwar road and  from the Jawhaar road.

In monsoon season, people are advised to take care as the water level suddenly rises.

References

Waterfalls of Maharashtra
Nashik